Te Pura Ngapera Panapa (1916–1980) was an Anglican priest
 
Panapa was educated at St John's College, Auckland and ordained in 1961. After a curacy at Holy Trinity, Stratford-on-Avon he was a missionary in Waitomo then Rangiātea. He was Archdeacon of Kapiti from 1970 until his death.

References

1916 births
University of Otago alumni
Archdeacons of Kapiti
1980 deaths